Žirovše (in older sources also Sirovše,  or Sirousch) is a small settlement east of Krašnja in the Municipality of Lukovica in the southeastern part of the Upper Carniola region of Slovenia.

References

External links

Žirovše on Geopedia

Populated places in the Municipality of Lukovica